Südost is a borough of the city of Wiesbaden, Hesse, Germany. With over 21,000 inhabitants, it is one of the most-populated of Wiesbaden's boroughs. It is located in the centre of the city. Südost is known for plenty of state agencies settled there.

References

Sources 
 Derived from German Wikipedia

External links 
 Official Wiesbaden-Südost website (in German)

Boroughs of Wiesbaden